There are many number 1 bus routes:

In Hong Kong:
 Citybus Route 1
 KMB Route 1

In the United Kingdom:
 London Buses route 1